Clara Ricciolini (1822-1869), was a Brazilian ballet dancer and stage actress. She played a pioneer role in the introduction of ballet in South America, and has been referred to as the only ballerina in Brazil during the mid 19th-century, when she was the a star attraction of the stage. 

She was the daughter of opera singers Gaetano Ricciolini and Isabel Rubio Ricciolini. She made her debut in the theater of João Caetano in 1837.  She was an appreciated actress, but was however to be more famous as a ballet dancer.

References 

 Sucena, Eduardo. "A Dança Teatral no Brasil" (Rio de Janeiro: Fundação Nacional de Artes Cênicas, 1988)

1822 births
1869 deaths
19th-century Brazilian actresses
19th-century ballet dancers
Brazilian people of Portuguese descent
Brazilian people of Italian descent
Brazilian ballet dancers
Brazilian stage actresses